The concerto for two harpsichords in C minor, BWV 1060, is a concerto for two harpsichords and string orchestra by Johann Sebastian Bach. It is likely to have originated in the second half of the 1730s as an arrangement of an earlier concerto, also in C minor, for oboe and violin. That conjectural original version of the concerto, which may have been composed in Bach's Köthen years (1717–1723), is lost, but has been reconstructed in several versions known as BWV 1060R.

History 

While the extant 18th-century manuscripts present the concerto in a form for two harpsichords and strings, the assumption that it originated as concerto for violin and oboe has become widely accepted since the late 19th century. The precise date for this earlier concerto is unknown, but it is believed to have been in existence from the early 1720s. The version for two harpsichords likely originated in or around 1736. A broader estimate for the time of origin of the version for two harpsichords is 1735–1740.

Structure 

The concerto is scored for two harpsichords (cembalo concertato I and II), two violin parts (violin I and II), viola and basso continuo. The difference in texture and figuration of both solo instruments is clearest in the outer Allegro movements. In these movements, the melody lines of the cembalo II part are generally more lyrical and less agile than those of the cembalo I part. The Adagio middle movement, where the melody lines of both solo instruments imitate one another without distinction in texture and figuration, has been likened to the middle movement of Bach's double violin concerto, BWV 1043.

Length: c. 14 minutes for the recording in

First movement: Allegro
The theme with which the first Allegro movement opens is transformed in various ways, returning in its original form only at the end of the movement.

Second movement: Adagio

The Adagio middle movement has a cantabile melody which is treated imitatively by both solo instruments, accompanied by the  string orchestra. 18th-century manuscripts contain two versions for the accompaniment: in one version the string instruments play with bows, in the other .

Third movement: Allegro
The  of the last movement has an up-tempo -like theme, on which also the episodes for the soloists are almost entirely based.

Reception 

In his early 19th-century Bach biography, Johann Nikolaus Forkel described the concerto as "very old", with which he probably meant he found its style antiquated. The concerto was published in 1848, edited by Friedrich Konrad Griepenkerl.

In the 1874 preface to the Bach Gesellschaft edition of the concerto for two harpsichords, Wilhelm Rust had suggested that the original version of the concerto would have been for two violins. In 1886 Woldemar Voigt wrote that the original instrument for the part of the second harpsichord was more likely an oboe, and that the original of the concerto could almost certainly be identified with a lost concerto for oboe and violin mentioned in a 1764 Breitkopf catalogue.

Reconstructed versions 

Max Schneider's reconstruction as a concerto for two violins in D minor was performed in 1920 at the Leipzig Bach Festival. According to Max Seiffert it makes more sense to keep the same key as the keyboard version, that is C minor, when reconstructing the concerto for violin and oboe soloists.

In his preface to the 1990 second edition of the Bach-Werke-Verzeichnis (BWV), Wolfgang Schmieder proposed to add a capital "R" to a BWV number to indicate a reconstructed version of a composition that is only extant in a later version, hence a reconstruction of a conjectured earlier version of the BWV 1060 concerto can be indicated as BWV 1060R. Schmieder used the 1060R catalogue number for a reconstruction in C minor, for oboe and violin soloists, in the 1990 version of the BWV.

Published reconstructions:

Recordings 
On CD recordings, BWV 1060R is often combined with Bach's violin concertos BWV 1041–1043.

The slow movement of Karl Richter's recording, with Hedwig Bilgram and the Münchener Bach-Orchester, also features in the soundtrack of Stanley Kubrick's Barry Lyndon.

References

Sources 
 
 
 
 
 
 
 
 
 
 
 
 
 
 
 Volume III

External links 
 

Concertos by Johann Sebastian Bach
Harpsichord concertos
Compositions in C minor